Ponte Punta Penna Pizzone also known as Ponte Aldo Moro is a Girder bridge that spans Mar Piccolo in Taranto. In 1978 it was named in honor of assassinated italian politician Aldo Moro.

References

External links

 

Bridges in Italy
Bridges completed in 1977
Taranto
1977 establishments in Italy
Buildings and structures in the Province of Taranto
Aldo Moro